Solomon Levitan (November 1, 1862 – February 27, 1940) was an American politician of the Republican Party who served as the treasurer of the state of Wisconsin on two occasions, once from 1923 to 1933, and again from 1937 to 1939.

Biography
Levitan was born in Tauroggen, East Prussia in 1862. A Jewish man, Levitan moved to Wisconsin and settled in the New Glarus, Wisconsin area in 1881 after antisemitism broke out in his native country. He later moved to Madison, Wisconsin, in 1905. Levitan died in 1940.

Career
Levitan twice ran unsuccessfully for treasurer before being elected in 1922. He served from 1923 to 1933 and again from 1937 to 1939. In 1924, he was delegate to the Republican National Convention. The convention nominated incumbent Calvin Coolidge for President of the United States, who would run against Democratic Party nominee John W. Davis of West Virginia and Progressive Party nominee Robert M. La Follette Sr. of Wisconsin, of whom Levitan had been a long-time supporter.

References

External links

People from Tauragė
People from New Glarus, Wisconsin
Politicians from Madison, Wisconsin
German emigrants to the United States
State treasurers of Wisconsin
Wisconsin Republicans
1862 births
1940 deaths